Cochlearia groenlandica, known in English as Danish scurvygrass or Greenland scurvy-grass, is a flowering plant of the genus Cochlearia in the family Brassicaceae.

The plant flowers between June to August. Cochlearia groenlandica grows on open ground, typically beaches, tidal flats, gravelly or sandy ground and mud flat bird nesting sites. Its range is circumpolar, and present in all major Arctic regions. In North America, its range reaches from Canada and Alaska to Oregon and it has been found as far south as California.

References

External links

groenlandica
Flora of Greenland
Plants described in 1753
Taxa named by Carl Linnaeus